Elena Ruslanovna Ilinykh (born 25 April 1994) is a Russian former competitive ice dancer. With partner Ruslan Zhiganshin, she is the 2015 Russian national champion. 

With former partner Nikita Katsalapov, she is a 2014 Olympic champion in the team event, a 2014 Olympic bronze medalist in ice dancing, a three-time European medalist (silver in 2013 and 2014; bronze in 2012), and the 2010 World Junior champion. Also along with former partner Nikita Katsalapov, she is the second-youngest Olympic Ice Dance medalist in history and the junior world record holder for the Original Dance.

Personal life 
Elena Ilinykh was born in Aktau (Shevchenko), Kazakhstan and raised in Moscow, Russia. Her parents divorced when she was two years old. From around 2006 to 2008, Ilinykh lived in Michigan with her grandmother and became fluent in English. Her mother adopted a two-year-old boy in around 2010. As of 2020, Ilinykh is engaged to ballet dancer Sergei Polunin. On 16 January 2020, their son, Mir, was born in Miami, Florida, U.S. Mir means 'peace' or 'world' in Russian. In April 2022, their second son, Dar, was born.

Ilinykh is a supporter of the 2022 Russian invasion of Ukraine and performed on Russian TV in support of the invasion.

Early skating career
As a child, Ilinykh trained in single skating, under Natalia Dubinskaya, until her mother decided she should try ice dancing. She was paired with Nikita Katsalapov, who had trained in the same singles group. Irina Lobacheva and Ilia Averbukh were the team's first coaches.

In 2005, Ilinykh/Katsalapov attended a training camp under Alexander Zhulin — who was preparing Tatiana Navka / Roman Kostomarov for their Olympic gold-medal winning season — but split soon after. In 2010, Ilinykh said that they were too young at the time to understand partnership. She left Russia and trained in Marina Zueva and Igor Shpilband's group in Canton, Michigan for two years without a partner.

At some point, she had a brief partnership with Ivan Bukin, the son of 1988 Olympic ice dancing champion Andrei Bukin.

Renewed partnership with Katsalapov

Junior career
In spring 2008, Ilinykh returned to Moscow after Katsalapov expressed interest in reuniting with her. He organized tryouts with her and other skaters at around the same time before making a final decision.

Ilinykh/Katsalapov rejoined Zhulin and began competing together in the 2008–09 season, placing fourth at the Russian Junior Championships. Their international debut came in the 2009–10 season. After winning gold medals at their Junior Grand Prix events in Budapest and Torun, they qualified to the JGP Final, where they took the silver medal behind Ksenia Monko / Kirill Khaliavin. Though second also at the Russian Junior Championships, Ilinykh/Katsalapov outscored Monko/Khaliavin for the gold at the 2010 World Junior Championships. They were named Discovery of the Year at the 2010 Crystal Ice Awards held in October 2010 in Moscow.

2010–11 season
For the 2010–11 season, Ilinykh/Katsalapov chose a ballet-themed free dance to Don Quixote: "[Zhulin] wanted us to do something classical Russian, and only very few people have done a real ballet program in dance." Ilinykh's tutu was made at the Bolshoi. They made their senior debut at the 2010 NHK Trophy where they finished fourth. At their next event, 2010 Cup of Russia, they won the bronze medal, their first medal on the senior Grand Prix series. At the 2011 Russian Nationals, they were second after the short dance behind Ekaterina Bobrova / Dmitri Soloviev but placed fourth in the free dance to finish third overall behind Ekaterina Riazanova / Ilia Tkachenko. However, their bronze medal was enough to earn them their first berth to the European Championships.

At the 2011 Europeans, Ilinykh/Katsalapov set new personal bests in the short dance (60.93), free dance (92.55) and combined total (153.48) to finish fourth in their debut at the event. They were in a battle with Riazanova/Tkachenko for Russia's second of only two berths to the 2011 World Championships. By finishing ahead of them, Ilinykh/Katsalapov won the right to make their senior Worlds debut. They finished seventh at the event. Following the end of the season, they ended their collaboration with Alexander Zhulin and Oleg Volkov to begin working with new coach Nikolai Morozov in May 2011. During the off-season, they spent some time in the U.S. preparing for the 2011–12 season.

2011–12 season
For the 2011–12 Grand Prix season, Ilinykh/Katsalapov were assigned to 2011 NHK Trophy and 2011 Trophée Eric Bompard. At NHK Trophy, they placed first in the short dance but in the warm-up before the free dance Ilinykh crashed into the boards and injured her knee. The couple finished the competition, winning the bronze medal, but withdrew from the exhibitions. Ilinykh/Katsalapov then finished fourth at the 2011 Trophee Eric Bompard. They won the silver medal at the 2012 Russian Championships. At the 2012 European Championships, Ilinykh/Katsalapov were seventh in the short dance but set a personal best in their free dance, resulting in an overall total of 153.12 points. They won the bronze medal at the event and then performed with Art on Ice. Ilinykh/Katsalapov finished 5th—the highest of the three Russian teams—at the 2012 World Championships. Their final event of the season was the 2012 World Team Trophy.

2012–13 season
Ilinykh/Katsalapov started their season with gold at the 2012 Crystal Skate of Romania. They won silver at their first 2012–13 Grand Prix event, the 2012 Rostelecom Cup. At the 2012 NHK Trophy, Ilinykh/Katsalapov were third after the short dance. Ilinykh fell ill before the free dance due to food poisoning but went on to compete. They placed second in the segment and won the silver medal. They qualified for the 2012 Grand Prix Final in Sochi, Russia, and finished sixth at the event. At the 2013 Russian Championships, Ilinykh/Katsalapov won the silver medal behind defending national champions Ekaterina Bobrova / Dmitri Soloviev. At the 2013 European Championships, they placed second in the short dance and first in the free dance. They won the silver medal, just 0.11 of a point behind gold medalists Bobrova/Soloviev. Ilinykh/Katsalapov finished 9th at the 2013 World Championships.

2013–14 season

Ilinykh/Katsalapov's first assignment of the 2013–14 Grand Prix season was the 2013 NHK Trophy where they placed fourth. At their next event, the 2013 Trophee Eric Bompard, they scored personal bests in both segments, finishing with an overall score of 171.89 points and winning the silver medal ahead of French ice dancers Nathalie Pechalat / Fabian Bourzat.

Ilinykh/Katsalapov won their third national silver medal at the 2014 Russian Championships behind Bobrova/Soloviev and then won silver at the 2014 European Championships with an overall score 1.1 points less than gold medalists Cappellini/Lanotte. At the 2014 Winter Olympics in Sochi, Ilinykh/Katsalapov were assigned to the free dance in the inaugural team event. They placed third in their segment and Team Russia won the gold medal. Ilinykh/Katsalapov then won the bronze medal in the individual ice dancing event behind champions Meryl Davis / Charlie White and silver medalists Tessa Virtue / Scott Moir. They scored personal bests in both segments and an overall total of 183.48 points. At 19 years of age, Ilinykh is second youngest Olympic ice dance medalist in history after Marina Klimova.

The next month, Ilinykh/Katsalapov traveled to Saitama, Japan for the 2014 World Championships. On 26 March 2014, just before the short dance, ITAR-TASS reported that they would split after the competition. Katsalapov had a serious error on the twizzles and they placed fifth in the short dance. Despite winning the next segment, they finished off the podium in the closely contested event. Their total score was just 1.05 less than the gold medalists. On 4 April 2014, Katsalapov confirmed to Ilinykh that he wanted to end their partnership.

Partnership with Zhiganshin 
Soon after, in early April 2014, Ilinykh accepted an invitation from Ruslan Zhiganshin's coaches to try out with their student. Coached by Elena Kustarova in Moscow, Ilinykh/Zhiganshin began training together in an unofficial partnership — the Russian federation having decided to give Ilinykh/Katsalapov time to reconcile — and received approval at the end of May.

2014–15 season
For the 2014–15 Grand Prix season, Ilinykh/Zhiganshin were assigned to Cup of China and Rostelecom Cup. Making their international debut, they placed fourth at Cup of China and then won the silver medal behind Americans Madison Chock / Evan Bates at Rostelecom Cup. They qualified for the Grand Prix Final in their first season as a team. At the GPF in Barcelona, they placed sixth in the short dance, fourth in the free dance, and sixth overall. At the 2015 Russian Championships, Ilinykh/Zhiganshin won the national title in their first season as a team.

2015–16 season
Ilinykh/Zhiganshin began their season at the Mordovian Ornament, which they won with new personal bests in all segments. For the 2015–16 Grand Prix season, they were once again assigned to Cup of China and Rostelecom Cup. They won the bronze at Cup of China behind Italians Anna Cappellini / Luca Lanotte and Americans Madison Chock / Evan Bates. Their next competition they finished 5th at the 2015 Rostelecom Cup. On 24–27 December, Ilinykh/Zhiganshin competed at the 2016 Russian Championships, where they finished 4th behind Alexandra Stepanova / Ivan Bukin after placing fourth in the short dance and second in the free dance.

Ilinykh/Zhiganshin decided to fly to Michigan on 27 February 2016 to work with Igor Shpilband.

2016–17 season 
They finished fourth at the 2017 Russian Championships, losing the bronze to Sinisina/Katsalapov by 0.17. They had a one-point deduction after part of their costume fell onto the ice.

Programs

With Zhiganshin

With Katsalapov

Competitive highlights
GP: Grand Prix; CS: Challenger Series; JGP: Junior Grand Prix

With Shibnev

With Zhiganshin

With Katsalapov

Detailed results
Small medals for short and free programs awarded only at ISU Championships.

With Zhiganshin

With Katsalapov

References

External links

 
 

1994 births
Living people
Russian female ice dancers
Figure skaters from Moscow
People from Aktau
European Figure Skating Championships medalists
World Junior Figure Skating Championships medalists
Figure skaters at the 2014 Winter Olympics
Olympic figure skaters of Russia
Medalists at the 2014 Winter Olympics
Olympic medalists in figure skating
Olympic gold medalists for Russia
Olympic bronze medalists for Russia
Kazakhstani emigrants to Russia